Onychomicrodictyon is a genus of Toyonian net-like small shelly fossil that probably belonged to a lobopodian resembling Onychodictyon or Microdictyon; the plates have a honeycomb structure with nodal flanges and an apical spinose extension. It is considered a junior synonym of Onychodictyon by some authors.

References

Prehistoric protostome genera